Cliodhna Deirdre Sharp (born 3 June 1976) is an Irish former cricketer who played as a right-handed batter. She appeared in nine One Day Internationals for Ireland between 1997 and 2000.

Sharp was born in Dublin. She made her international debut in August 1997, aged 21, in a One Day International (ODI) match against South Africa. At the 1997 World Cup in India, Sharp played in only two of her team's matches, against Denmark and South Africa. She made four further ODI appearances over the following two seasons (three against Australia in 1998 and one against India in 1999), but had little success. Sharp's last matches for Ireland came at the 2000 World Cup in New Zealand. She again played in only two matches, scoring a career-high 19 runs against India, but making a five-ball duck against the Netherlands.

References

External links
 
 

1976 births
Living people
Cricketers from Dublin (city)
Irish women cricketers
Ireland women One Day International cricketers